The 2016 Wake Forest Demon Deacons men's soccer team represents Wake Forest University during the 2016 NCAA Division I men's soccer season. It is the 70th season of the university fielding a program. It the program's second season with Bobby Muuss as head coach. Muuss, the fourth head coach in program history, formerly coached Denver, and took over for Jay Vidovich, who left for a head coaching position with Portland Timbers 2.

Roster 

As of 2016:

Schedule 

|-
!colspan=6 style="background:#000000; color:#cfb53b;"| Preseason
|-

|-
!colspan=6 style="background:#000000; color:#cfb53b;"| Regular season
|-

|-
!colspan=6 style="background:#000000; color:#cfb53b;"| ACC Tournament
|-
|-

|-
!colspan=6 style="background:#000000; color:#cfb53b;"| NCAA Tournament
|-

|-

Rankings

See also 

 Wake Forest Demon Deacons men's soccer
 2016 Atlantic Coast Conference men's soccer season
 2016 NCAA Division I men's soccer season
 2016 ACC Men's Soccer Tournament
 2016 NCAA Division I Men's Soccer Championship

References 

Wake Forest Demon Deacons
Wake Forest Demon Deacons men's soccer seasons
Wake Forest Demon Deacons, Soccer
Wake Forest Demon Deacons
NCAA Division I Men's Soccer Tournament College Cup seasons
Wake Forest
2016